Buena Vista Downtown Historic District is a national historic district located at Buena Vista, Virginia. The district encompasses 38 contributing buildings and 1 contributing structure in the central business district of Buena Vista. The buildings are primarily one- and two-story masonry structures, with the earliest built in 1889–1890.  Notable buildings include the Buena Vista Post Office (1930), Buena Vista War Memorial Building (1954), Peoples Bank of Buena Vista (1907), Dickinson Building (c. 1907), Royer's Restaurant (c. 1940), the Advocate Building (1889), Buena Vista Masonic Building (c. 1910), and the Valley Steam Laundry Building (c. 1905).  The Buena Vista Company Building (1890) is separately listed as the Old Courthouse.

It was listed on the National Register of Historic Places in 2009.

References

Historic districts on the National Register of Historic Places in Virginia
Buildings and structures in Buena Vista, Virginia
National Register of Historic Places in Buena Vista, Virginia